The Association of the Mediterranean Chambers of Commerce and Industry (ASCAME) is a non-profit international organisation that represents the Mediterranean private sector, regrouping Chambers of Commerce and Industry and other similar entities from both shores of the Mediterranean.  

ASCAME was founded on 1st October 1982. The Constitutive General Assembly was held in Barcelona, hosted by the Barcelona Chamber of Commerce, Industry and Navigation.

Nowadays, ASCAME is the main representative of the Mediterranean private sector with a network of over 300 Chambers of Commerce from the 23 countries around the Mediterranean basin.

ASCAME is a consolidated entity that represents the interest of the Mediterranean Chambers of Commerce and the Mediterranean private sector, also being accredited as an economic partner of the European Union and other international organisations in carrying out economic cooperation projects. ASCAME represents North and South Chambers and businesses regardless of their size and sector of activity.

History

The Association of the Mediterranean Chambers of Commerce and Industry (ASCAME) was founded on October 1, 1982, as an initiative of the Barcelona Chamber of Commerce in conjunction with its counterparts from different Mediterranean countries.

Beginning with approximately ten founding members in 1982, today ASCAME has grown to bring together over 300 hundred Chambers of Commerce and similar institutions, from 23 Mediterranean countries.

ASCAME was created with the primary goal of furthering economic cooperation throughout the Mediterranean region, showing a strategic vision of North-South cooperation and integration. This vision was confirmed in Barcelona by the establishment of the Euro-Mediterranean Partnership in 1995.

Nowadays, almost 40 years since its inception, this strategic vision has been strongly reinforced. Through ASCAME, the private sector is positioned in the regional political agenda to catalyst solutions that can answer accordingly to the changing socioeconomic scenarios in the region.

Objectives

According to article 3 of the Statutes, “The fundamental purpose of this Association is to establish permanent contacts and forge lasting relationships among its members in order to co-ordinate, implement and promote studies and joint actions with a view to developing economic exchanges and co-operation within the Mediterranean area of international scope.”

The objectives that the association wants to achieve are:

 Establishment of a network of Chambers of Commerce and organisations working in the field of cooperation and economic exchange between countries in the Mediterranean region
 Promotion and search of synergies between these countries' economies
 Creation of working ties between peer institutions aimed at encouraging international cooperation through joint performance of activities and/or studies
 Assertion of the Mediterranean identity
 Contribution to build an area of peace, tolerance, security and prosperity

ASCAME serves as a unique instrument for the socioeconomic development of the region through:

 A close collaboration with the most important organisations and international institutions of the Mediterranean region
 The promotion of regional and international economic activities
 The involvement in Euro-Mediterranean cooperation projects

Members

The Association envisages two types of membership: Full Members, which are Chambers of Commerce and Industry of countries riparian to the Mediterranean, and Associate Members, which are the various Mediterranean institutions and organisations having a relationship with the objectives of ASCAME.

Today, around 75% of its members are Chambers of Commerce and Industry from different Mediterranean countries and around 10% are national Chambers of Commerce and bilateral Chambers of Commerce. Nearby 10% of its members are business representative organisations, employees’ organisations and associations for economic promotion.

The rest of members are port authorities, promotion agencies and fairs, among others.

ASCAME has currently members from Albania, Algeria, Bosnia and Herzegovina, Cyprus, Croatia, Egypt, France, Germany, Greece, Israel, Italy, Jordan, Lebanon, Libya, Macedonia, Malta, Montenegro, Morocco, Palestine, Serbia, Spain, Syria, Tunisia and Turkey.

Organisation

ASCAME's operating structure consists of:

 General Assembly. The General Assembly is composed of all members. Its main task is to define the general policy and major lines of the activity of the Association.
 Executive Committee. The Executive Committee is the permanent management and administrative body of ASCAME. The Executive Committee consists of only full members bordering the Mediterranean Sea, in the number of one per country.
 Bureau. The Bureau consists of eight Chambers of Commerce and Industry chosen from the Executive Committee. The Bureau acts on behalf of the Executive Committee in regards to ordinary and ongoing matters. 
 General Secretariat. The Executive Committee nominates a Chamber among the members to act as ASCAME General Secretariat. This position is currently held by the Barcelona Chamber of Commerce, Services, Industry and Navigation. The General Secretariat is responsible for monitoring the decisions taken by the General Meeting, the Executive Committee and the Bureau, conserving ASCAME records and providing secretarial services
 Committees and Working Commissions

The Working Commissions

The ASCAME Working Commissions are created by the Executive Committee in order to achieve the objectives of the Association. They are the heart of the Association and act as think thanks for ideas, proposals and programmes related to different fields and relevant sectors of the Mediterranean. This allows ASCAME to focus on the main objectives of its Strategic Plan.

The Working Commissions are composed of members of the Association, as well as of other experts, who may be invited to participate in the Commissions' meetings and activities.

The current ASCAME Working Commissions are the following:

 Tourism 
 International Relations 
 Arbitration and Mediation 
 Innovation and ICT 
 Women Entrepreneurs 
 Logistics and Transport 
 Renewable Energies
 Young Entrepreneurs
 Conventional Energy
 Consular Cooperation, Business and Partnerships
 Environment, Climate Change and Water
 Urban Development
 Industry and Intellectual Property
 Training and Education
 Industrial Cooperation and Outsourcing
 Meetings, Incentives, Conventions and Events (MICE)
 Integrity Values and Business Ethics
 Agrifood
 Trade, Retail and Franchise

Activities

ASCAME carries out several activities aimed at promoting the economic development of the region, namely events, working groups and cooperation projects.

The Association’s work as an interlocutor is recognised by relevant regional and international institutions, such as the European Union, the Union for the Mediterranean, the European Investment Bank, the Arab League etc., through numerous collaboration agreements and joint participation in a large number of cooperation projects, as well as in various concrete actions. All this, as a result of being the organisation that, with the greatest extension in the territory, has the biggest experience to create platforms for dialogue and business economic cooperation in the Mediterranean region. Therefore, ASCAME occupies a prominent place in the field of cooperation between Chambers of Commerce, cities and companies in the Mediterranean field.

ASCAME provides support and advice to its Chambers of Commerce members, encourages contacts between them and promotes their initiatives. The Association plays a significant role in the field of international cooperation between Chambers of Commerce, a role that has been acknowledged by leading European and international institutions. It also occupies a privileged position in terms of representing the private sector in the region.

International cooperation

ASCAME has signed several cooperation agreements with relevant institutions in order to achieve its objectives and cooperate in its work for the economic development of the Mediterranean.

Among others, ASCAME has signed cooperation agreements with the following institutions:

Union for the Mediterranean (Ufm), European Investment Bank (EIB), European Institute of the Mediterranean (IEMed), Eurochambres, Association of Organisations of Mediterranean Business Women (AFAEMME), MEDCities, Word Federation of Free Zones (FEMOZA), Association of Iberoamerican Chambers of Commerce (AICO), Forum of the Adriatic and Ionian Chambers of Commerce, FERRMED, U.S Chambers of Commerce, MedCruise, International Chamber of Commerce - World Chamber Federation, Euro-Mediterranean Network of Social Economy, Mediterranean Hotels and Restaurants Association (MH&RA), World Tourism Organisation (WTO), World Federation of Consuls, World Business Angels Investment Forum (WBAF) and Arab-Brazilian Chamber of Commerce (CCAB) among others.

References

External links
http://www.ascame.org/

International non-profit organizations
Chambers of commerce